Haemodoraceae is a family of perennial herbaceous flowering plants with 14 genera and 102 known species. It is sometimes known as the "bloodroot family". Primarily a Southern Hemisphere family, they are found in South Africa, Australia and New Guinea, and in the Americas (from SE U.S.A. to tropical South America). Perhaps the best known are the widely cultivated and unusual kangaroo paws from Australia, of the two closely related genera  Anigozanthos and Macropidia.

Taxonomy
The Haemodoraceae were first described by Robert Brown in 1810, and bear his name as the botanical authority. An alternative name has been Haemodoreae

The fourth Angiosperm Phylogeny Group classification of 2016 (unchanged from the earlier APG systems of 2009, 2003 and 1998), also recognizes this family and places it in the order Commelinales, in the clade commelinids, in the monocots. The family of the Haemodoraceae then includes about sixteen sub-tropical or tropical genera found in the southern hemisphere, two in North America and three known cultivated genera in Europe.

Description
Haemodoraceae is characterized by distichous leathery leaves, which are alternate, succulent, rather large and often ensiform, with entire margins and parallel veins. The leaves are enclosed by a sheath with free margins and alternate, distichous (= in two vertical ranks).

The plants are hermaphroditic. Pollinators are primarily insects, but also birds or sometimes a small mammal. The wooly-haired flowers grow at the end of a leaflet stalk, in cymes (with lateral branches), panicles or racemes.

The family is represented in Southwest Australia by extreme diversity, including around six genera that only occur in that region. The endemic species include the kangaroo paws, Anigozanthos and Macropidia, and the most speciose genus of the family, Conostylis.

Genera

The term "bloodwort" can also apply to Sanguinaria canadensis (more often called bloodroot) or Achillea millefolium (more often called yarrow or common yarrow), in other families.

References

Bibliography

 
 
 The families of flowering plants  Descriptions, illustrations, identification, information retrieval.   
 Monocot families'' (USDA)
 Haemodoraceae at CSDL
 overview of taxa in Western Australia  (144 entries)

External links
 

 
Commelinid families